Cheng Wentao (born 18 May 1998) is a Chinese synchronised swimmer.

She participated at the 2019 World Aquatics Championships, winning a medal.

References

1998 births
Living people
Chinese synchronized swimmers
World Aquatics Championships medalists in synchronised swimming
Artistic swimmers at the 2019 World Aquatics Championships